Saint-Bernard-de-la-Chapelle, is a Neo-gothic Roman Catholic parish church in the Goutte d'Or neighborhood of the 18th arrondissement of Paris, located at the intersection of the Rue Saint-Bruno and the Rue Affre.

Saint-Bernard is also the name of the chapel of the Gare Montparnasse.

History 
Until 1860, the Goutte d'Or formed part of the commune of La Chapelle, and was thus served by the historic village Church of Saint-Denys de la Chapelle, where Joan of Arc paused when entering Paris in 1429. The construction and development of the Gare du Nord, immediately to the south of the Goutte d'Or, led to a significant increase in the neighbourhood's population, thus generating a need for a new church. Construction of this church – the future Saint-Bernard-de-la-Chapelle – began in 1858 and was completed in 1861, by which time the Goutte d'Or neighbourhood was part of the 18th arrondissement of Paris, following the incorporation of a number of communes (including La Chapelle) into an expanded city of Paris.

A number of occupations of buildings took place in Paris in the first half of 1996, including the Église Saint-Ambroise de Paris, the Gymnase Japy, and an SCNF depot. The occupations were mostly organised by migrants without official status, protesting against their treatment at the hands of the French government. On 28 June 1996, a group of around 300 people then occupied Saint-Bernard-de-la-Chapelle, attracting a significant amount of media attention. On 23 August 1996, 525 gendarmes, 500 local police officers, and 480 Compagnies républicaines de sécurité officers were mobilised by the government to assault the church, break the occupation, and detain migrants in the centre de rétention de Vincennes.

References

External links

Saint Bernard's organ 

Roman Catholic churches in the 18th arrondissement of Paris
Roman Catholic churches completed in 1861
1861 establishments in France
19th-century Roman Catholic church buildings in France